Landshut is a city in Bavaria, Germany.

Landshut may also refer to:
 Battle of Landshut (1809), during the Napoleonic Wars
 Landshut (district), a district neighboring the aforementioned city
 Landshut (Lufthansa Flight 181), a plane hijacked by the Popular Front for the Liberation of Palestine in 1977
 Landshuter Hochzeit (Wedding of Landshut), a medieval pageant
 Landshut, Switzerland, a former municipality and district in the Canton of Bern, Switzerland. Now part of Utzenstorf
 Landshut Castle, Switzerland, a castle in Utzenstorf, Switzerland
 Landshut Castle, Germany, a ruin above the town of Bernkastel-Kues

 Lanžhot, a town in South Moravia, Czech Republic
 Landshut Bridge in Elgin, Scotland

See also 
 Landshuth (old spelling)